Gotzon is a Basque name that may refer to the following notable people:
Given name
Gotzon Garate Goihartzun, Spanish writer and linguist
Gotzon Mantuliz (born 1988), Spanish designer and model
Gotzon Martín (born 1996), Spanish cyclist
Gotzon Udondo (born 1993), Spanish cyclist

Surname
Jenn Gotzon (born 1979), American actress, model, speaker and author

Basque masculine given names